The Finn class at the 2011 ISAF Sailing World Championships was held in Perth, Western Australia between 5 and 11 December 2011.

Results

References

External links

Finn
Finn Gold Cup